, known professionally as Tofubeats, is a Japanese singer, record producer, and DJ.

Kawai began producing music at the age of 14, under the name "DJ Newtown". He initially distributed his music online through websites such as 2channel and YouTube. He later released music with Maltine Records, a Japanese netlabel, before signing with the Warner Music Japan sublabel Unborde in 2013. Kawai also manages HIHATT, a label he launched in 2018.

The video for his song "No. 1" featuring G.Rina was nominated for an MTV Video Music Award Japan for Best Dance Video (in 2014), and his album titled First Album for the Grand Prix at the 2015 CD Shop Awards.

Discography

Albums

As Tofubeats

As DJ Newtown

EPs 

 Remix albums
 Lost Decade Remixes (19 September 2013)
 First Album Remixes (28 January 2015)
 Positive Remixes (20 January 2016)
 Fantasy Club Remixes & Instrumentals (27 July 2018)
 RUN Remixes (4 September 2020)
 Reflection Remixes (3 November 2022)

Singles 
 See the singles section in the Japanese Wikipedia.

Music videos

References

External links 
 
 Profile at Warner Music Japan
 Profile on the Oricon website
 News related to tofubeats at Natalie
 Interview for CDJournal, 2 May 2013

Japanese record producers
Japanese DJs
1990 births
Living people
Musicians from Kobe
21st-century Japanese singers
21st-century Japanese male singers
Japanese male pop singers